District Assemblies and City District Government were introduced in 2000 by Pakistan's President Pervez Musharraf. Musharraf announced holding of Community  Government elections, which began from December 2000 at Union Council level and came to a completion with District Assemblies, elections on July, 2001. 

The assemblies have the function of implementing laws and policies of the government at the local level, such as education,  as well decision making at the local level.

References

Local government in Pakistan